Concrete Castles is an American rock band from Erie, Pennsylvania.

History

In 2009, five elementary aged friends from Erie, Pennsylvania, formed M4 (Mini Men Making Music), under the tutorage of guitar teacher Ryan Krysiak. After going through several lead vocalists who quit the band for different reasons, Audra Miller joined in 2013 and has been their lead singer since. In December 2015, the band changed their name to First to Eleven. In 2016, they played at the Vans Warped Tour. In 2017 and 2018 most of the original five members left the band for college, with only Matthew Yost remaining as a founding member. Sam Gilman and Krysiak (who had acted as the band’s manager for their entire career) joined as replacements. In January 2021, First to Eleven’s YouTube channel reached one million subscribers.

In February 2021, Miller, Yost, and Gilman announced they had signed with Velocity Records, as well as Equal Vision Records, under the name Concrete Castles. The band released their first single, “Just a Friend”, in March. They played their first show on June 5th, 2021 at the Atlantic City Beer & Music Festival. Their debut album, "Wish I Missed U", was released on September 17, 2021, with names such as Blake Harnage producing. That same month, they embarked on a tour with Against The Current. They continued to tour throughout 2022, playing with many different acts including Oxymorrons and Set It Off.

Members
 Audra Miller – Vocals
 Matthew Yost – Guitar
 Sam Gilman – Drums

Discography

Albums

“Wish I Missed U” (September 17th, 2021)

Featured on

"Sedated" by Bear Grillz and Stryer (July 2021)

References 

Alternative rock groups from Pennsylvania
2009 establishments in Pennsylvania
Equal Vision Records artists
Female-fronted musical groups